The fourth-generation Jeep Grand Cherokee (WK2) is a mid-size SUV. It was introduced in 2010 for the 2011 model year by Jeep. The unveiling took place at the 2009 New York Auto Show, where it was very well received and garnered 30 awards.

Design

The new body design represented a 146 percent increase in torsional rigidity compared to the previous design, which helped to improve durability and reduce noise, vibration, and harshness.

Like the previous generations, the chassis is steel unibody. Unlike previous models, the new WK2 features a four-wheel independent suspension for better on-road handling. The Grand Cherokee (with the 2011 Durango) WK2 platform uses a derivative related to Mercedes-Benz's W166 series.

Four-wheel drive systems include Quadra-Trac I, Quadra-Trac II, and Quadra-Drive II. Using Selec-Terrain, the driver can select modes for Auto, Sport, Snow, Sand/Mud, and Rock.

Powertrain

Engine choices included the 3.6 L Pentastar V6 or the 5.7 L Hemi V8. The Hemi V8 retained the Multiple Displacement System (MDS) that shuts down four cylinders in low-power driving situations, and the V8 remains coupled with the multi-speed automatic transmission which includes Electronic Range Selection (ERS) to manually limit the high gear operating range.

The 3.6 L Pentastar V6 replaces the 3.7 L and 4.7 L PowerTech engines. The 5.7 L Hemi engine was retained as the V8 option, although no Hemi badging is used on the exterior of the vehicle. Also, the WK program code remains.

On January 14, 2013, at the Detroit Auto Show, Jeep announced that this new EcoDiesel engine will become available in the 2014 Grand Cherokee, together with the new 8HP70 8-speed automatic transmission. The new 3.0 L CRD turbodiesel engine is offered in European markets in a  low-power version.

The SRT Hellcat supercharged V8 was made available for the Grand Cherokee Trackhawk. With , it became the most powerful SUV Chrysler has ever produced.

Trim levels

The Jeep Grand Cherokee (WK2) is available in several different trim levels:

Laredo (2014–2020): The Laredo was the base model of the Grand Cherokee until the 2020 model year. There are no additional options or packages available for this trim level.

Laredo "E" (born 2011): The Laredo "E" was the original base model of the Grand Cherokee. The Laredo "E" included SiriusXM satellite radio and a power driver's seat, which were no longer offered in the base Laredo. This trim level had some options, like 18-inch aluminum-alloy wheels, an 8.4-inch infotainment system, and heated front seats. An Altitude package for the Laredo "E" added black 20-inch wheels and exterior accents, leather seats with microfiber inserts, heated front seats, a power rear liftgate, a moonroof, and other optional features.

Upland (2018–2021): The Upland is based on the Laredo E trim level, and used styling elements from the Trailhawk trim level. It included 20-inch black-painted aluminum-alloy wheels, light blue-accented emblems, and light blue stitching on the seats, interior door panels, and center console.

Laredo "X" (2011–2013, 2020- ): The Laredo "X" was the "step-up" trim level of the Grand Cherokee. It added 18-inch wheels, leather seats, power front seats, a touch-screen infotainment system, a 9-speaker, 506-watt Alpine surround-sound audio system, Bluetooth, heated front and (optional) heated rear seats, remote start, and an (optional) power rear tailgate. Other optional equipment for this trim level included the 5.7 L Hemi MDS/VCT gasoline V8 engine, a dual-pane panoramic moonroof, and GPS navigation.

Trailhawk (2013, 2017–2021): The Trailhawk is the "off-road" model of the Grand Cherokee, was based on the Laredo "X" in 2013 and returned for 2017 based on the Limited. It adds leather seats with microfiber inserts, 18-inch dark gray wheels, a Selec-Terrain control system with Quadra-Lift air suspension, and Kevlar-belted on/off-road tires.

Limited (born 2014): The Limited is the "step-up" trim level of the Grand Cherokee, and succeeded the Laredo "X". It offers the same standard equipment as the Laredo "X", but offers additional options such as heated and ventilated front seats, a driver's memory system, Nappa leather seats, and 20-inch wheels. The 5.7 L Hemi MDS/VCT V8 gasoline engine, as well as the 3.0 L EcoDiesel V6 turbocharged diesel engine (starting in 2014), are the other engine options for the Limited.

Sterling Edition (2018): The Sterling Edition was a trim level of the Grand Cherokee only available for the 2018 model year, celebrating its 25th year of production. While offering the same standard equipment as the Limited model, the Sterling Edition added 20 "Heritage" aluminum-alloy wheels, an 8.4-inch touchscreen infotainment system with Apple CarPlay and Android Auto, the same Alpine audio system as the Laredo X, interior color combination options, interior trim, and commemorative exterior badges. A Luxury Group was available for the Sterling Edition that added ventilated front seats, adaptive cruise control, blind-spot detection, rear cross-traffic alert, a panoramic dual-pane sunroof, and other options. The 5.7 L Hemi V8 engine was optional.

Overland (2011–2021): The Overland is the luxury trim level of the Grand Cherokee, adding to the Limited: Leather-trimmed dashboard and upper door panels, wood-accented steering wheel, Nappa leather seats, a dual-pane panoramic moonroof, GPS navigation, 20-inch wheels, blind-spot monitoring, adaptive cruise control, and other features. The 5.7 L Hemi MDS/VCT V8 gasoline engine, as well as the 3.0 L EcoDiesel V6 turbocharged diesel engine (starting in 2014), are the other engine options for the Overland.

Overland Summit (2011–2013), Summit (since 2014): The (Overland) Summit is the most luxuriously equipped trim level of the Grand Cherokee, adding the following to the Overland: interior color options, a 19-speaker Harman Kardon surround-sound audio system with 825-watt amplifier (2014–present), 20-inch chromed aluminum-alloy wheels, and other features. In 2017, the Summit added quilted and perforated leather surfaces, aluminum-alloy wheels, and the Summit California Edition package, which replaces some of the chrome exterior accents with color-keyed accents.

SRT (2012–2021): The SRT was the highest-performance Grand Cherokee available until 2018, when the Trackhawk arrived. The SRT is powered by the 6.4 L Hemi MDS/VCT 392 Cubic Inch V8 engine, and features more exterior and interior styling. Several special edition models, such as the SRT Alpine, Vapor, and Red Vapor Editions, were "limited-run" models that were based on the SRT.

SRT Trackhawk (2018–2021): The SRT Trackhawk model debuted for 2018, and became the highest-performance model in the Grand Cherokee lineup. While offering the same equipment as the SRT, the SRT Trackhawk swapped the SRT's 6.4 L Hemi V8 engine for the same 707-horsepower 6.2L supercharged HEMI V8 engine that is used in the Dodge Challenger (LA) SRT Hellcat and the Dodge Charger (LD) SRT Hellcat. The SRT Trackhawk is the most powerful Grand Cherokee model to date, following the 1998 Jeep Grand Cherokee (ZJ) 5.9 L Limited, the 2006-2010 Jeep Grand Cherokee (WK) SRT8, and the 2012-2013 Jeep Grand Cherokee SRT8.

Issues and criticism

Maneuverability and handling, 2012

In 2012, Swedish automotive magazine Teknikens Värld revealed that the Jeep Grand Cherokee failed one of their avoidance maneuver tests known as the "Moose test". Other SUV models in its class had no issues passing the test. German magazine Auto, Motor und Sport (AMS) later tested the same press vehicle in a slightly different avoidance maneuver test that meets ISO (International Organization for Standardization) standards. Unlike the results of the Swedish test, the Jeep remained on all four wheels and did not lose any tires to a blowout.

Shifter recall 

In 2016, approximately 1.1 million 2014–2015 Jeep Grand Cherokees were recalled for rollaway risks because the design of the shifter may cause drivers to have difficulty determining whether or not the vehicle is still in gear. The offending shifter had already been discontinued, with 2016 and up Grand Cherokees using a redesigned unit that functioned more traditionally.

The issue was linked to 41 injuries, 212 crashes, and 308 reports of property damage and shortly after the recall was announced, actor Anton Yelchin was killed by his Grand Cherokee rolling backward into him after he exited it while it was still in gear. Yelchin's death caused FCA to accelerate the recall campaign and take steps to get the affected Jeeps repaired faster than originally planned. Yelchin's family filed a wrongful death lawsuit against FCA that was settled out of court in 2018.

Updates

2011
On April 20, 2011, Jeep announced that the SRT8 version would be debuted at the 2011 New York Auto Show. It can accelerate from 0–60 mph in 4.7 seconds and can do the quarter-mile in 13.4 seconds. Auto reviews measured this at 4.5 seconds, making the 2014 SRT the fastest Jeep ever produced at the time.

The Grand Cherokee SRT8 debuted alongside two other vehicles manufactured by Chrysler Corporation: the Chrysler 300 SRT8 and Dodge Charger SRT8, both of which also took a one-year hiatus while the new models debuted.

The new Grand Cherokee SRT8, which started production on July 16, 2011, is equipped with a  6.4 L Hemi V8 engine. Jeep claims the new SRT8 gets 13 percent better fuel economy than its predecessor. To improve gas mileage, Jeep has employed a new active exhaust system that lets Chrysler's cylinder-deactivation Fuel Saver Technology operate over a wider rpm band.

2012 
For the 2012 model year, V8 models were updated to use the 65RFE 6-speed automatic transmission.

2013 
For the 2013 model year, Jeep introduced the Trailhawk off-road oriented trim. For the Overland Summit trim, Front Park Assist, power-folding side mirrors, and headlight washers became standard equipment and Nappa leather seats became available in black or saddle-colored.

Jeep also introduced "Alpine" and "Vapor" special edition models of the Grand Cherokee SRT8. Production of each model for the U.S. market was limited to 400 units. The "Alpine" model was painted in Bright White and the "Vapor" model was painted in Brilliant Black. Features of both models include the standard 20-inch wheels in a Black Vapor Chrome finish and a glossy black color for exterior badges, front grille trim, rear light bar, and bumper step pad.

2014

On January 14, 2013, Jeep unveiled a revised WK2 Grand Cherokee at the North American International Auto Show at Cobo Center, along with a revised 2014 Jeep Compass and Jeep Patriot. The new Grand Cherokee offered a 3.0 L DOHC V6 diesel engine that gets up to 30 MPG, a 3.6 L Pentastar V6 engine that gets up to 24 MPG and has , a 5.7 L Hemi V8 engine that gets up to 21 MPG and has , and the 6.4 L Hemi engine produces  (SRT only). The models are the Laredo, the Limited, the Overland, and the Overland Summit Edition model has been renamed Summit. A new front end with a revised body-colored grille, new, smaller headlamps, and new tail lamps round out the exterior changes. The silver bezel on the back was removed. The opening rear tailgate window of previous models has been replaced with fixed glass. There are also new seventeen, eighteen, and twenty-inch wheel and tire choices. The SRT8 model will continue to be offered but as an "SRT" and not an "SRT8" badged model, and for the first time will offer details like blacked-out head and tail lamps. Inside, the Summit model receives the SRT's nineteen-speaker Harman/Kardon surround sound system, all Grand Cherokees receive a new steering wheel with paddle shifters standard in every model, an eight-speed TorqueFlite 8 automatic transmission, and an 8.4-inch touch screen display with Garmin navigation software, an optional CD player, and the U Connect Access System first introduced in 2013 Ram 1500. A U Connect 5.0 touch-screen radio will also be available with an optional CD player. The Selec-Terrain System receives multiple upgrades on four-wheel-drive Grand Cherokees. New exterior colors, interior fabrics and materials, and interior colors become available.

For 2014, "SRT8" was no longer a model of Jeep, but a separate corporate entity. The "8" designation was dropped in the "SRT" line for this year, the Grand Cherokee being referred to as a "SRT Jeep Grand Cherokee." The SRT model received many features. For example, in the interior, it received a steering wheel with the SRT insignia, twenty-inch alloy wheels, "performance" tires, and additional SRT-only details, including:
 6.4 L V8, /, propelling it from 0-60 mph in 4.5 seconds
 Six-piston Brembo Brakes at the front and four-piston Brembo brakes at the rear
 3-season tires (optional)
 SRT-only "performance pages" in the head unit, displaying engine statistics, quarter mile/0-60, and other metrics
 Nappa leather seats with SRT-only Alcantara inserts and headliner
 Fascia covering hitch (if so provisioned)
 Suspension modes, including track mode
 "Launch" mode, designed to model professional driver techniques
 Upgraded software for transmission, with over 90 gear shift programs

2015

The 2015 Limited Edition model no longer has dual exhausts. This feature only comes in the Overland and up editions. There are no other major changes for the 2015 model year. However, the Limited, Summit, and Overland trims will include HD Radio as part of the U Connect feature. The SRT receives a modest  bump, in part due to a reflash of the PCM.

2017

At the 2016 New York International Auto Show, Jeep announced new updates for its Grand Cherokee mid-size SUV, which included two new trim levels:

The Trailhawk trim level is the "off-road" oriented trim level, which made its initial appearance in 2013, returned for 2017. It includes a Quadra-Drive II four-wheel-drive system along with a Quadra-Lift air suspension system, the Selec-Speed control, and Hill Descent Control. It will offer the same seven-slot front grille that was first offered on the 2016 Grand Cherokee Laredo and Limited 75th Anniversary Edition models, red-painted front-mounted tow hooks, standard eighteen-inch and optional twenty-inch alloy wheels, special off-road tires with Kevlar belts, Neutral Gray-painted exterior accents and badges, optional Mopar side rock rails, a standard U Connect 8.4-inch touch-screen infotainment system, red accent stitching throughout the interior, a 'Trailhawk' emblem on the steering wheel, brushed Piano black interior trim panels, and gunmetal finished interior components.

The Summit trim level is the "upscale" version of the Grand Cherokee, which was revamped in 2014, and was revamped again for 2017. It offers a restyled front grille with LED front fog lamps and twenty-inch polished alloy wheels. Its features include cross-stitched leather-trimmed interior, Active Noise Cancellation, an acoustic windshield and front side glass, leather-trimmed dashboard and door panel inserts, a nineteen-speaker, 825-watt Harman Kardon surround-sound system, automatically folding power side-view mirrors, a suede-trimmed headliner, a blind-spot monitoring system, lane departure warning, parallel and perpendicular park assist systems, Berber carpeting, and other interior appointments.

New exterior paint color options include Rhino, Diamond Black Crystal Pearl Coat, Light Brown Stone, True Blue, and Ivory Pearl Coat (availability varies by trim level).

All 2017 models received a second facelift that features new alloy wheel designs, reshaped headlights, and a reshaped grille. The new grille and headlights come from the 75th Anniversary Edition models of 2016, however, without the bronze-painted accents. In addition, all models receive a new 'GRAND CHEROKEE' emblem for the front doors.

The 75th Anniversary Edition models, based on the base Laredo and mid-level Limited, also continue on for 2017.

The SRT trim for 2017 got a new front fascia and a new interior.

2018

Jeep introduced the 2018 Jeep Grand Cherokee SRT Trackhawk at the 2017 New York International Auto Show. The SRT Trackhawk is the highest-performance Grand Cherokee model to date.

Specifications
 Requires 91-octane unleaded fuel
 Eight-speed ZF automatic transmission with steering-wheel-mounted shift paddles 
 Flat-bottomed steering wheel
 Five-passenger seating capacity
 All-wheel-drive (AWD)
 6,200 RPM redline
 Laguna leather interior with carbon fiber trim 
 Brembo brake system (6-piston front and 4-piston rear calipers)
 55/45 weight distribution (estimated)
 curb weight (estimated)
 gross vehicle weight rating (GVWR) (estimated)
 payload (estimated)
 Standard 20" x 10" polished forged aluminum wheels with "Titanium II"-painted pockets and satin-chrome wheel center caps
 Optional 20" x 10" loss-gloss black lightweight aluminum wheels with black wheel center caps
 Standard P295/45ZR20 Pirelli Scorpion Verde runflat all-season tires
 Optional P295/45ZR20 Pirelli P-Zero run-flat 3-season tires
 3.70 rear axle ratio
 maximum towing capacity

Additional changes to the rest of the 2018 Jeep Grand Cherokee lineup (aside from the SRT Trackhawk model) include:

 Standard seven-inch infotainment system with Apple CarPlay and Android Auto (Laredo, Laredo "E", and Limited models, replaces the previously standard five-inch color touch-screen radio)
 All models receive the 4C latest-generation infotainment systems with Apple CarPlay and Android Auto 
 8.4-inch infotainment system without GPS navigation is discontinued as an option
 75th Anniversary Edition models of the Laredo "E" and Limited are discontinued
 Laredo and Laredo "E" get new seventeen-inch aluminum-alloy wheels and a new cloth seating style as standard equipment
 The eighteen-inch aluminum-alloy wheel available in the 18-inch wheel and 8.4-inch Radio Package for the Laredo "E" is redesigned
 The 3.0L EcoDiesel Turbocharged Diesel V6 engine option returns (re-certified) for the Limited, Overland, and Summit (late availability)
 The SRT 392 gets new twenty-inch "Carbon Fiber Monkey" aluminum-alloy wheels as standard equipment
 Summit, SRT 392, and SRT Trackhawk get an interior trim package
 Active Noise Cancelling is now included on all audio systems but the standard six-speaker audio system
 Second-generation 850RE automatic transmission replaces the previous 845RE automatic transmission (4X4 Models with 3.6L Pentastar VVT V6 engine)
 Jeep Brown and Summit Gray interior color options become available for Summit
 Sterling Edition Package celebrating the 25th Anniversary of the Jeep Grand Cherokee, is available on Limited 
 High Altitude Edition model, based on Overland, returns for 2018

The "base" U Connect 7.0 Infotainment System includes:
 AM/FM radio
 Two (2) USB inputs (both syncing)
 Apple CarPlay and Android Auto connectivity
 Bluetooth with stereo audio streaming
 3.5-millimeter auxiliary audio input jack 
 Voice control
 "Park View" rearview backup camera
 Seven-inch color touch-screen display
 Standard on Laredo, Laredo "E", and Limited

The "upgraded" U Connect 8.4 Infotainment System with GPS Navigation includes all of the existing features of the U Connect 7.0 Infotainment System, but also adds the following features:
 AM/FM radio with HD Radio
 SiriusXM satellite radio with a 1-year subscription
 SiriusXM Travel Link with a 1-year subscription
 U Connect Guardian Services (Provided by SiriusXM) with trial subscription (Including 9-1-1 emergency call and roadside assistance call buttons)
 4G LTE mobile Wi-Fi capabilities (Provided by AT&T Wireless) with trial subscription
 U Connect apps
 GPS navigation by Garmin
 8.4-inch color touch-screen display
 Standard on Altitude, Trailhawk, Sterling Edition, Overland, High Altitude, Summit, SRT, and SRT Trackhawk 
 Optional on Laredo "E" (Requires 18-inch wheel and 8.4 radio group) and Limited

Both radios include the option to add a single-disc, center console-mounted CD/MP3 player, and some trim levels equipped with the 8.4-inch radio can also be equipped with a rear-seat DVD and Blu-ray entertainment systems with dual screens, HDMI input, and independent CD/MP3/DVD/Blu-ray players, with two pairs of wireless headphones also included in the package. On Limited, Trailhawk, and Sterling Edition models, the Luxury Group is required to have the rear-seat entertainment system option. The option can be selected independently on all other trim levels.

A six-speaker, non-amplified audio system is standard on Laredo, Laredo "E", Altitude, and Limited models. A nine-speaker, 506-watt Alpine amplified surround-sound audio system is included on Trailhawk, Sterling Edition, Overland, High Altitude, SRT, and SRT Trackhawk models, and is optional on Altitude, Limited, and Summit models. An eighteen-speaker, 825-watt Harman Kardon amplified surround-sound audio system comes standard on the Summit model, and is optional on Overland, SRT, and SRT Trackhawk models.

2019 

Largely unchanged for 2018, the 2019 model year Grand Cherokee receives only a few minor changes. The 25th Anniversary Sterling Edition model is now discontinued, though its aluminum-alloy wheel design is now standard on the Overland trim, and optional on the midlevel Limited trim. Laredo, Laredo E, Upland (now available with two-wheel-drive), Altitude, Limited, Trailhawk, Overland, High Altitude, Summit, SRT 392, and SRT Trackhawk models continue for 2019. The 8.4 touchscreen is updated to a high-definition "Dissociated" display for the 2019 model year.

A new Limited X Package adds SRT-inspired styling cues to the mid-level Limited trim. The Overland and Summit trims gain new aluminum-alloy wheel designs.

The mid-level Limited trim receives a standard U Connect 4C 8.4 infotainment system with Garmin GPS navigation, which was previously available as an extra-cost option, leaving only the base Laredo, Laredo E, and Upland trims with the base U Connect 4 7.0 infotainment system as standard equipment. In addition, the U Connect 4C 8.4 infotainment system with Garmin GPS navigation receives a new 8.4-inch, high-definition "Dissociated" touchscreen display, which was first introduced on the 2017 Chrysler Pacifica minivan.

Blind Spot Detection System (BLIS) and Forward Collision Warning System (FCWS), previously extra-cost options available as part of a package on top-level trims of the Grand Cherokee, are now standard equipment on all Grand Cherokee trim levels.

Three new exterior colors, Green Metallic, Sting Gray, and Slate Blue were offered for 2019. A new interior color scheme, Black and Bridle Brown was also added for the Summit trim level, and both Trailhawk and Overland trims receive new Piano Black interior trim accents.

Trim levels that continue for 2019 are Laredo, Laredo E, Upland, Altitude, Limited, Trailhawk, Overland, High Altitude, Summit, SRT, and SRT Trackhawk, with Limited X being new for 2019.

Grand Cherokee WK (2022) 
For 2022, Jeep marketed the outgoing Grand Cherokee WK2 alongside the all-new Grand Cherokee WL model as the "Grand Cherokee WK" (not to be confused with the Grand Cherokee (WK), which was produced from 2005 until 2010). The lineup is condensed to base Laredo "E", mid-level Laredo "X", and range-topping Limited trims, with the only the 3.6 L Pentastar V6 gasoline engine. However, in addition to the Stellantis-produced (but ZF derived) 850RE 8-speed automatic transmission, the ZF-produced 8HP75 8-speed automatic transmission, built in Germany and previously only available with the 5.7 L HEMI V8 gasoline engine, will also be offered as at no additional cost on all models.

Production

In 2009, the company announced a US$1.8 billion,  expansion of its Jefferson North Assembly plant in Detroit to allow flexible manufacture of the next-generation model, as well as the 2011+ Dodge Durango off the same platform that was developed jointly with Mercedes (ML Chassis).

Safety

Euro NCAP

Insurance Institute for Highway Safety (IIHS)

2013

*vehicle structure rated "Marginal"

2022
The 2022 Grand Cherokee WK was safety tested by the IIHS:

NHTSA

Awards

2011
AutoWeek: Best of the Best 2011 Truck 
Car and Driver: 2011 Editors' Choice Awards/Mid-size SUVs 
Car and Driver: Best Performer – Interior Sound Level 
Top Safety Pick for 2011 from the IIHS
Consumers Digest Best Buy for 2011
Safest SUV in America by MSN Autos
Truck of the Year for 2011 by The Detroit News

Notes

References

External links

 Jeep Grand Cherokee website
 

Grand Cherokee (WK2)
All-wheel-drive vehicles
Mid-size sport utility vehicles
Euro NCAP large off-road
2010s cars
Cars introduced in 2009
Motor vehicles manufactured in the United States